Pleurotomella amplecta is a species of sea snail, a marine gastropod mollusk in the family Raphitomidae.

Description
The length of the shell attains 12 mm, its diameter 5 mm.

(Original description) The shell is fusiform. It contains nine whorls, including the protoconch. Its colour is dull white. The protoconch consists of two rounded microscopically spirally grooved whorls.

Sculpture: On the first adult whorl there are nine or ten radials, which decrease to six on the lower whorls. These are discontinuous, prominent, vertical, ceasing at the fasciole and on the base. The spirals are evenly spaced, sharp, elevated, overriding and denticulating the ribs, increasing by intercalation from two above to about eighteen below. These are again traversed by a secondary sculpture of fine radiating threads. The fasciole is broad, excavate, crossed by close, sharp, and crescentic lamella. The aperture is imperfect in the holotype. The siphonal canal is slightly twisted.

Distribution
This marine species is endemic to Australia and occurs off New South Wales.

References

 Laseron, C. 1954. Revision of the New South Wales Turridae (Mollusca). Australian Zoological Handbook. Sydney : Royal Zoological Society of New South Wales pp. 56, pls 1–12. 
 Powell, A.W.B. 1966. The molluscan families Speightiidae and Turridae, an evaluation of the valid taxa, both Recent and fossil, with list of characteristic species. Bulletin of the Auckland Institute and Museum. Auckland, New Zealand 5: 1–184, pls 1–23 
 Beu, A.G. 2011 Marine Molluscs of oxygen isotope stages of the last 2 million years in New Zealand. Part 4. Gastropoda (Ptenoglossa, Neogastropoda, Heterobranchia). Journal of the Royal Society of New Zealand 41, 1–153

External links
 
 Brazier, J. 1876. A list of the Pleurotomidae collected during the Chevert expedition, with the description of the new species. Proceedings of the Linnean Society of New South Wales 1: 151–162

amplecta
Gastropods described in 1922
Gastropods of Australia